Zachary Ryan Thomas (born June 21, 1996) is an American professional basketball player for Keravnos of the Cypriot League. He played college basketball for Bucknell University.

College career

A 6'7" power forward, Thomas came to Bucknell from Oakdale High School in Ijamsville, Maryland. Thomas had a standout career at Oakdale, ultimately becoming the all-time leading scorer in Frederick County history and the first player to eclipse the 2,000 point mark. He selected Bucknell based on their basketball success and academic reputation.

Thomas worked his way into the starting lineup in his sophomore season, then enjoyed a breakout season as a junior in 2016–17. He averaged 15.9 points, 6.6 rebounds and 3.4 assists per game, and was ultimately named to first-team All-Patriot League alongside classmate Nana Foulland. In the 2017 Patriot League tournament, Thomas led the Bison to the league title, scoring 17 points and grabbing 9 rebounds in the title game, earning Most Valuable Player honors. With the win, the Bison advanced to the 2017 NCAA tournament, where they lost to 4 seed West Virginia in the first round.

Thomas entered the 2017–18 season as a preseason All-Patriot League selection. Additionally, he was named to the Lou Henson Award mid-season watch list.

On February 26, 2018, Thomas was named Patriot League Player of the Year.

Professional career
After going undrafted in the 2018 NBA draft, Thomas was later included in the 2018 NBA Summer League roster of the Utah Jazz. On July 27, 2018, Thomas signed with Okapi Aalstar in Belgium. After a successful year playing in Belgium, Thomas was brought into the NBA Summer League once again, this time to play for the Houston Rockets.

On July 17, 2019, he signed with VL Pesaro of Italian Lega Basket Serie A. But due to the coronavirus pandemic in Italy and the suspension of the Italian league, Thomas left the team on March 10.

On October 13, 2020, Thomas signed with BC Budivelnyk in Ukraine.

On January 6, 2021, he signed with Wilki Morskie Szczecin of the PLK. Thomas averaged 6.0 points and 2.6 rebounds per game.

On September 6, 2021, he signed with Bisons Loimaa of the Koripallon I-divisioona.

During summer 2022, he signed with Keravnos of the Cypriot League.

References

External links
Bucknell Bison bio
College stats

1996 births
Living people
American expatriate basketball people in Belgium
American expatriate basketball people in Italy
American expatriate basketball people in Poland
American expatriate basketball people in Ukraine
American men's basketball players
Basketball players from Maryland
Basketball players from Minnesota
BC Budivelnyk players
Bisons Loimaa players
Bucknell Bison men's basketball players
Keravnos B.C. players
Norrköping Dolphins players
Okapi Aalstar players
People from Frederick County, Maryland
People from Maplewood, Minnesota
Power forwards (basketball)
Sportspeople from the Minneapolis–Saint Paul metropolitan area
Sportspeople from the Washington metropolitan area
Victoria Libertas Pallacanestro players